Domenica Cameron-Scorsese (born September 6, 1976) is an American actress.

Biography 
She was born in California and is the daughter of Julia Cameron and Martin Scorsese. She is a graduate of Wesleyan University.

Scorsese is known for acting in Cape Fear (1991), The Age of Innocence (1993), and Bullfighter (2000).

In 2017, her feature-length directorial debut Almost Paris was screened at the 2017 Golden Door International Film Festival. Almost Paris tells of a former Wall Street banker who has to return home after the mortgage lending crisis.

She married in 2011 in Chicago.

Filmography

References

External links 
 

1976 births
Living people
Actresses from California
American film actresses
Wesleyan University alumni
American women film directors
21st-century American women